The Smith Peninsula is an ice-covered, "dog-legged" peninsula  long and  wide, extending in an easterly direction between Keller and Nantucket Inlets from the east coast of Palmer Land, Antarctica, into the south-western Weddell Sea.

Discovery and naming
The peninsula was photographed from the air in December 1940 by members of the United States Antarctic Service Expedition (USAS), and in 1947 by members of the Ronne Antarctic Research Expedition (RARE) under Finn Ronne, who in conjunction with the Falkland Islands Dependencies Survey (FIDS) charted it from the ground. It was named by Ronne for Walter Smith, ship's mate, navigator, and trail man with Ronne's expedition.

Important Bird Area
A 292 ha site on fast ice in the northern part of Clarke Bay has been designated an Important Bird Area (IBA) by BirdLife International because it supports a breeding colony of about 4,000 emperor penguins, estimated from 2009 satellite imagery.

References

 
Important Bird Areas of Antarctica
Penguin colonies
Peninsulas of Palmer Land